Carson Elementary School may refer to:

Carson Elementary School (Quesnel)
Carson Elementary School (Carson, Washington)
Carson Elementary School (Texas)